San Wai Tsai is a village in Tai Po District, Hong Kong.

Administration
San Wai Tsai is a recognized village under the New Territories Small House Policy. It is one of the villages represented within the Tai Po Rural Committee. For electoral purposes, San Wai Tsai is part of the Hong Lok Yuen constituency, which was formerly represented by Zero Yiu Yeuk-sang until May 2021.

See also
 Ying Pun Ha Chuk Hang, a nearby village

References

External links

 Delineation of area of existing village San Wai Tsai (Tai Po) for election of resident representative (2019 to 2022)

Villages in Tai Po District, Hong Kong